The Darling Riverine Plains is an interim Australian bioregion located in southern Queensland and northern New South Wales. South Eastern Queensland bioregion is part of the Southeast Australia temperate savanna ecoregion.

Subregions
The Darling Riverine Plains bioregion consists of nine subregions:

 Culgoa-Bokhara (DRP01) – 
 Warrambool-Moonie (DRP02) – 
 Castlereagh-Barwon (DRP03) – 
 Bogan-Macquarie (DRP04) – 
 Louth Plains (DRP05) – 
 Wilcannia Plains (DRP06) – 
 Menindee (DRP07) – 
 Great Darling Anabranch (DRP08) – 
 Pooncarie-Darling (DRP09) –

References

Biogeography of Queensland
Biogeography of New South Wales
IBRA regions
Murray-Darling basin